St. Mark's on the Isle of Man is a hamlet or other unincorporated area within the parish of Malew.  It includes St. Mark's Church and two other Registered Buildings, and is the center of a Conservation Area.

St. Mark's Church
St Mark's Church, St Mark's is Registered Building #182, listed 9 May 2001.

It was consecrated in 1772.

Old School/House, St. Mark's
Old School/House, St Mark's is Registered Building #181, listed 6 December 2000.

The school and a house for its master were built c.1845 in "Manx vernacular style".  The school library had 302 volumes in 1847.

Church Cottages, St. Mark's
Church Cottages, St Mark's are Registered Building #184, listed 9 May 2001.

They are a row of cottages at St. Mark's. Two of the row of cottages were rebuilt from a previous school in 1846; a third was added in 1899.

St. Mark's Village Conservation Area

St. Mark's is the centre of the St. Mark's Village Conservation Area, established in 2003, one of Isle of Man's 21 Conservation Areas.

References

Populated places in the Isle of Man